Goon is the debut studio album by Canadian singer-songwriter Tobias Jesso Jr. released on March 17, 2015 in the United States and Canada. The album was preceded by the two singles "How Could You Babe" and "Hollywood".

The album was a short-listed nominee for the 2015 Polaris Music Prize.

Musical style
Jesso's music has been compared to singer/songwriters of the 1960s and 1970s from Randy Newman to Harry Nilsson and Emitt Rhodes. Even though he was a bassist and guitarist for years, his new music was written by him on the piano—an instrument he started playing at the age of 27.

Reception

Goon received universal acclaim from contemporary music critics. At Metacritic, which assigns a normalized rating out of 100 to reviews from mainstream critics, the album received an average score of 81, based on 25 reviews, which indicates "universal acclaim".

Will Hermes of Rolling Stone noted "his debut LP gathers 12 beautifully lean ballads sung in a vulnerable tenor, with vintage studio touches blended by sharp producers including JR White, Patrick Carney and Ariel Rechtshaid."

Accolades

Track listing

Personnel
Tobias Jesso Jr. – vocals, piano, guitar, bass
Danielle Haim – drums on track 3
Chet "JR" White – production
Ariel Rechtshaid – production on track 1
Patrick Carney – production
John Collins – production
Chris Coady – mixing

References

2015 debut albums
Tobias Jesso Jr. albums
True Panther Sounds albums
Albums produced by Chet "JR" White
Albums produced by Ariel Rechtshaid
Albums produced by Patrick Carney
Albums recorded at Kingsize Soundlabs
Albums recorded at Electro-Vox Recording Studios